Sergio Orozco (born in Popayán, Colombia) is a designer of furniture and lighting. His works are influenced by international experience and worldwide background.
He studied violin for many years, then at the age of 18 he moved to the capital, Bogotá, planning to pursue his musical studies. His goals changed, however, when he found he was developing even more serious interest in art, design and architecture. So, after two years of fine wood model making and musical instrument construction in Bogotá, he moved to Europe where he traveled extensively and studied painting, sculpture and design.
In 1980, he came to New York where he attended Parsons The New School for Design.
In 1989, the successful Sergio Orozco Design Inc studio was established, attracting many national and international clients with a variety of products manufactured around the world.
In The New York Times Sergio is quoted, "The secret of furniture design is to create something great that begins with the human being in mind and the desire to please the eyes and the body". In another profile article by Home Furnishings Daily (HFD), he is quoted as saying, " I consider myself as an artist with a mission, a very simple one, to create an atmosphere, a climate, an ambiance where human beings, can feel comfortable and in harmony with my furnishings and with themselves".

Lighting designs 
In the early 1990s, he designed ceiling fans for Craftmade with the Firenze and Savona

Honors and awards 

Winner of the Interior Design ROSCOE Award for residential furniture.
Winner of Roscoe Certificate for Outstanding Achievement in Product Design.
Winner of the 11TH ARTS AWARD and first ever PRODUCT DESIGNER OF THE YEAR.

Associations 

Orozco is a Professional Member of The Industrial Designers Society of America (IDSA), a Professional Member and a former Director of The American Society of Furniture Designers (ASFD), an ALA Professional Member and an Official Spokesperson for The American Lighting Association, a Professional Member of The Accessories Resource Team (ART), a Member of the Illuminating Engineering Society of North America (IESNA), a LAMPS PLUS CDLC (Certified Decorative Lighting Consultant), Member of Edgewood Golf Country Club and a contributing Design Editor for the HL&A Magazine and Contract Lighting magazine.

References

External links
 https://www.nytimes.com/2002/09/22/nyregion/art-and-engineering.html
 http://www.homelighting.com/article.cfm?intarticleID=321
 http://www.sergioorozco.com

Colombian designers
Year of birth missing (living people)
Living people
Parsons School of Design alumni